Spring vetch is a common name for several plants and may refer to:

Lathyrus vernus, native to Europe and Siberia
Vicia lathyroides, native to Europe and western Asia
Vicia sativa